Jackson Township is one of the nineteen townships of Wood County, Ohio, United States.  The 2010 census found 792 people in the township, 489 of whom lived in the unincorporated portions of the township.

Geography
Located in the southwestern corner of the county and possessing Wood County's share of a "four corners" boundary, it borders the following townships:
Milton Township - north
Liberty Township - northeast corner
Henry Township - east
Portage Township, Hancock County - southeast corner
Pleasant Township, Hancock County - south
Van Buren Township, Putnam County - southwest corner
Bartlow Township, Henry County - west
Richfield Township, Henry County - northwest corner

The village of Hoytville is located in southeastern Jackson Township.

Name and history
Jackson Township was established in 1840. The township was named for Andrew Jackson, seventh President of the United States (1829–1837). It is one of thirty-seven Jackson Townships statewide.

Government
The township is governed by a three-member board of trustees, who are elected in November of odd-numbered years to a four-year term beginning on the following January 1. Two are elected in the year after the presidential election and one is elected in the year before it. There is also an elected township fiscal officer, who serves a four-year term beginning on April 1 of the year after the election, which is held in November of the year before the presidential election. Vacancies in the fiscal officership or on the board of trustees are filled by the remaining trustees.

References

External links
County website

Townships in Wood County, Ohio
Townships in Ohio